Operation Lyari was a Pakistan Government crackdown against local gangs and other crime syndicates and part of the greater Karachi Operation.

Background

Historical Factors
Karachi is a cosmopolitan city and biggest city of Pakistan having a population more than 20 million, consisting of many ethnic communities. The city's demographics play an important role in its politics. Ethnic politics have resulted in sporadic violence throughout Karachi's history, often leading to bloody conflicts. After the independence of Pakistan in 1947, Muslim immigrants from areas constituting modern-day India migrated in large numbers to the newly created Muslim nation of Pakistan and became settled in Karachi, the historical capital of the Sindh province. These migrants had educated, middle-class to upper-class backgrounds and came from cultured families; they came to be known as Muhajir people (Muhajir meaning "immigrant"). They dominated much of Karachi's businesses, something which was feared and resented by many of the province's native Sindhi people and radical Sindhi nationalists. After the breakaway of East Pakistan in 1971 and the formation of Bangladesh, Pakistan accepted a large number of Biharis (known as "Stranded Pakistanis") loyal to the country, trapped in Bangladesh and offered them citizenship. The Bihari migrants assimilated into the diverse Urdu-speaking Muhajir population. Some Bengalis in Pakistan also stayed behind.
The Pashtuns (Pakhtuns or Pathans), originally from Khyber Pakhtunkhwa, FATA and northern Balochistan, are now the city's second largest ethnic group in Karachi after Muhajirs. With as high as 7 million by some estimates, the city of Karachi in Pakistan has the largest concentration of urban Pashtun population in the world, including 50,000 registered Afghan refugees in the city. As per current demographic ratio Pashtuns are about 25% of Karachi's population.

Karachi's status as a regional industrial centre attracted migrants from other parts of Pakistan as well, including Punjab, Balochistan and Pashtun migrants from the frontier regions. Added to this were Iranians, Arabs, Central Asians as well as thousands of Afghan refugees who came to Karachi, initially displaced by the Soviet invasion of Afghanistan; some of the Afghan and Pashtun migration brought along conservative tribal culture, further intensifying ethnic and sectarian violence and also giving rise to mob culture.

Ethnic Differences
There are several ethnic groups in Lyari including Sindhis, Kashmiris, Seraikis, Pakhtuns, Balochis, Memons, Bohras Ismailis, etc. The ethnic mix has resulted in political parties being affiliated with specific communities. Examples are;
Muttahida Qaumi Movement (MQM) was founded for the political interests of the Muhajir people.
Pakistan People's Party (PPP) is popular among Sindhis & Balochis and Lyari in particular was (PPP) stronghold.

Religious & Sectarian Differences
Sectarian parties and Sunni-Shia conflict have also led to violence in this district with many wanted terrorists hiding out in Lyari.

Operations in 2012
Lyari had long been a stronghold of Pakistan Peoples' Party (PPP). The PPP took under its wing a well known gangster named Abdul-Rehman Baloch, alias Rehman Dakait, to keep the Lyari vote bank in check by not allowing other parties access to Lyari. In exchange Rehman Dakait would be allowed a free rein to extort local businesses, smuggle drugs, arms and ammunition. This agreement was the brainchild of Zulfiqar Mirza and then President Asif Ali Zardari who placed Rehman Dakait as the leader of a newly formed Peoples' Aman Committee in 2008 to look after the affairs of Lyari and to regulate crime in his territory. He brought down petty crime and became a local hero. Despite his enhanced reputation he went on his own crime spree unchecked and became the undisputed crime boss in Lyari. He soon fell out with the PPP, by 2009 he was a wanted man and was killed in a police encounter in August 2009.

The Peoples' Aman Committee was then taken over by his first cousin and partner in crime Uzair Jan Baloch. Uzair was an ardent enemy of MQM and after several targeted killings came under pressure from the PPP to disband. Despite being officially defunct, the organization continued to function de facto on the ground. The government finally issued a notification on October 11, 2011 which banned the Peoples' Aman Committee under Clause (11/B) of Anti-terrorism Act 1997. The Sindh Home Ministry, after banning the People's Aman Committee (PAC), finally issued its notification. Additionally, the ministry directed law enforcement agencies to monitor the activities of the committee.

Uzair Jan Baloch had become a serious liability for PPP. A member of his gang, Saqib alias Sakhi, was killed in police encounter on April 1, 2012. Uzair Jan and many of his colleagues were also booked by the police for the murder of a policeman. Rival gangs began to kill his men. Uzair Jan felt betrayed and blamed the current activism against him on the PPP politicians of Lyari such as Malik Mohammad Khan along with National Assembly member from Lyari Nabeel Gabol and MPA Saleem Hingoro.  Uzair Jan Baloch on April 26, 2012 assassinated Malik Mohammad Khan while he was leading a procession of party activists against the conviction of Prime Minister Yousuf Raza Gilani by the Supreme Court in a contempt case. The Interior Minister Rehman Malik after conferring with the President and other PPP members decided to start an operation to seize and destroy the Lyari gangs.

The Lyari operation commenced on April 27, 2012. Uzair's house was raided, with the criminal eluding capture. MPA Sania Baloch condemned the raid and said that she would raise the issue in the assembly. Early on police and local authorities made progress, however stiff resistance caused high casualties on all sides, resulting in a 48-hour suspension on May 4, 2012. The Inspector General (IG) of Sindh police Mushtaq Shah addressed a press conference at Central Police Office in Karachi stating that the Lyari operation was in its final stages and that the Taliban along with other criminals were involved in Lyari clashes. However, there was no way to corroborate this information. The operations of 2012 were abruptly halted when Nawaz Sharif intervened, to cash in on the conflict between the rivals and win the votes of people of Lyari. Pakistan Muslim League-Nawaz's Sindh leader Raja Saeed met with Uzair Baloch, and also expressed solidarity with the people of Lyari. The 2012 operations were a predominantly a police led operation but only succeeded in arresting a minority of gangsters.

Operations in 2013
In 2013 operations were conducted under the new Federal Government of Pakistan Muslim League (N) after Prime Minister Nawaz Sharif visited Karachi and devised a strategy to curb violence. With the provincial government of PPP on board, the prime minister gave a go-ahead to Pakistan Rangers to conduct raids and arrest criminals. The targeted operation began on September 7, 2013 and since then more than a thousand suspects have been arrested. The Interior Minister Chaudhry Nisar Ali Khan recently declared the first phase of the operation a success.

Death of Baba Ladla

Notorious Lyari gang leader, Noor Muhammad alias Baba Ladla was killed in Lyari during a shootout with Pakistani Rangers.

References

Baba Ladla, two others killed in Rangers shootout

External links 
 Karachi Website.
 Imagining Lyari through Akhtar Soomro

History of Sindh (1947–present)
History of Karachi
Government of Yousaf Raza Gillani
Police operations in Pakistan
2012 in Pakistan
Lyari Town
Crime in Karachi
Lyari